Kurunegala electoral district is one of the 22 multi-member electoral districts of Sri Lanka created by the 1978 Constitution of Sri Lanka. The district is conterminous with the administrative district of Kurunegala in the North Western province. The district currently elects 15 of the 225 members of the Sri Lankan Parliament and had 1,183,649 registered electors in 2010.

1982 Presidential Election
Results of the 1st presidential election held on 20 October 1982 for the district:

1988 Presidential Election
Results of the 2nd presidential election held on 19 December 1988 for the district:

1989 Parliamentary General Election
Results of the 9th parliamentary election held on 15 February 1989 for the district:

The following candidates were elected:
G. M. Premachandra (UNP), 68,562 preference votes (pv); Amara Piyaseeli Ratnayake (UNP), 58,426 pv; Sarathchandra Bandara Welagedara (UNP), 44,437 pv; Upali Mervin Senarath Dasanayaka (UNP), 43,804 pv; Ariya Bandara Rekawa (UNP), 42,874 pv; Ukkubanda Wijekoon (UNP), 42,801 pv; Adikari Mudiyanselage Piyasoma Upali (UNP), 41,691 pv; S.B. Nawinne (SLFP), 38,696 pv; Wanninayaka Mudiyanselage Herath Banda Wanninayaka (UNP), 34,627 pv; Herath Mudiyanselage Ariyawardanage Lokubanda (UNP), 34,525 pv; A.M. Munidasa Premachandra (SLFP), 32,699 pv; Dissanayaka Mudiyanselage Bandaranayaka (UNP), 31,788 pv; Diunugallage Peter Wickramasinghe (SLFP), 31,609 pv; Lionel Rajapaksa (SLFP), 31,419 pv; and Jayasena Rajakaruna (SLFP), 30,346 pv.

1993 Provincial Council Election
Results of the 2nd North Western provincial council election held on 17 May 1993 for the district:

1994 Parliamentary General Election
Results of the 10th parliamentary election held on 16 August 1994 for the district:

The following candidates were elected:
S.B. Nawinne (PA), 122,611 preference votes (pv); Gamini Jayawickrama Perera (UNP), 109,900 pv; T. B. Ekanayake (PA), 59,313 pv; A.M. Munidasa Premachandra (PA), 58,293 pv; Salinda Dissanayake (PA), 57,641 pv; Anura Priyadharshana Yapa (PA), 57,127 pv; Bandula Basnayake (PA), 56,609 pv; Adikari Mudiyanselage Piyasoma Upali (UNP), 54,881 pv; Amara Piyaseeli Ratnayake (UNP), 53,421 pv; Ahamad Hasan Mohamad Alavi (UNP), 52,381 pv; Alawatuwala Jayadeva Chandrawansha (UNP), 51,691 pv; Dissanayake Mudiyanselage Bandaranayake (UNP), 50,901 pv; Herath Mudiyanselaage Ariyawaardhanage Loku Banda (UNP), 50,535 pv; Diyunugalge Peter Wickramasinghe (PA), 49,383 pv; and R.M. Jayasena Rajakaruna (PA), 47,073 pv.

1994 Presidential Election
Results of the 3rd presidential election held on 9 November 1994 for the district:

1999 Provincial Council Election
Results of the 3rd North Western provincial council election held on 25 January 1999 for the district:

1999 Presidential Election
Results of the 4th presidential election held on 21 December 1999 for the district:

2000 Parliamentary General Election
Results of the 11th parliamentary election held on 10 October 2000 for the district:

The following candidates were elected:
Gamini Jayawickrama Perera (UNP), 123,847 preference votes (pv); Johnston Fernando (UNP), 94,385 pv; S.B. Nawinne (PA), 81,259 pv; Jayarathna Herath (PA), 61,853 pv; Anura Priyadharshana Yapa (PA), 60,479 pv; Piyasoma Upali (UNP), 54,756 pv; Salinda Dissanayake (PA), 52,727 pv; Rohitha Bogollagama (UNP), 52,095 pv; Sarath Munasinghe (PA), 51,530 pv; Amara Piyaseeli Ratnayake (UNP), 51,498 pv; Rathnayake Mudiyanselage Rathna Nimal Bandara (UNP), 49,962 pv; Somakumari Tennakoon (PA), 49,476 pv; Ranjith Navaratne (PA), 49,174 pv; Munidasa Premachandra (PA), 48,905 pv; and Nimal Herath (JVP), 3,407 pv.

2001 Parliamentary General Election
Results of the 12th parliamentary election held on 5 December 2001 for the district:

The following candidates were elected:
Gamini Jayawickrama Perera (UNF), 141,702 preference votes (pv); Johnston Fernando (UNF), 114,845 pv; S.B. Nawinne (PA), 78,718 pv; Salinda Dissanayake (PA), 69,963 pv; Indika Bandaranayake (UNF), 69,513 pv; Anura Priyadharshana Yapa (PA), 67,717 pv; Rohitha Bogollagama (UNF), 65,576 pv; D.M. Bandaranayake (UNF), 52,808 pv; Piyasoma Upali (UNF), 50,963 pv; Amara Piyaseeli Ratnayake (UNF), 50,963 pv; Anura Gopallawa (UNF), 48,672 pv; Jayarathna Herath (PA), 47,471 pv; T. B. Ekanayake (PA), 43,994 pv; Somakumari Tennakoon (PA), 42,918 pv; and Bimal Rathnayaka (JVP), 4,240 pv.

2004 Parliamentary General Election
Results of the 13th parliamentary election held on 2 April 2004 for the district:

The following candidates were elected:
Anura Kumara Dissanayaka (UPFA-JVP), 153,868 preference votes (pv); Gamini Jayawickrama Perera (UNF-UNP), 119,176 pv; Bimal Rathnayaka (UPFA-JVP), 116,736 pv; M. D. Namal Karunaratne (UPFA-JVP), 114,516 pv; Johnston Fernando (UNF-UNP), 112,601 pv; Akila Viraj Kariyawasam (UNF-UNP), 83,114 pv; Anura Priyadharshana Yapa (UPFA-SLFP), 65,724 pv; Indika Bandaranayake (UNF-UNP), 65,275 pv; T. B. Ekanayake (UPFA-SLFP), 57,079 pv; S.B. Nawinne (UPFA-SLFP), 53,876 pv; Jayarathna Herath (UPFA-SLFP), 53,236 pv; Dayasiri Jayasekara (UNF-UNP), 52,576 pv; Salinda Dissanayake (UPFA-SLFP), 52,520 pv; Bandula Basnayake (UPFA-SLFP), 52,099 pv; Amara Piyaseeli Ratnayake (UNF-UNP), 46,725 pv; and Rohitha Bogollagama (UNF-UNP), 44,206 pv.

2004 Provincial Council Election
Results of the 4th North Western provincial council election held on 24 April 2004 for the district:

The following candidates were elected:
Athula Wijesinghe (UPFA), 71,298 preference votes (pv); S. A. Ranasinghe (UPFA), 50,949 pv; A. D. Sumanadasa (UPFA), 45,310 pv; K. M. Nimal Herath (UPFA), 44,141 pv; H. M. K. Manik Gunasekara (UPFA), 43,829 pv; S. N. Wickramasinghe (UPFA), 40,647 pv; Neil Priyantha Liyanage (UPFA), 38,344 pv; K. A. Gunadasa Khannangara (UPFA), 37,482 pv; R. D. Wimaladasa (UPFA), 36,660 pv; Adikari Mudiyanselage Tikiribandara Adikari (UPFA), 33,973 pv; R. B. S. W. M. Manjula C. R. Bandara (UNP), 30,757 pv; R. M. Nilantha Supun Rajapaksha (UPFA), 30,720 pv; Kumara Keerthi Chandrasiri (UPFA), 29,618 pv; Ajith Rohana Devatha Pejjalage (UNP), 29,604 pv; R. P. D. Gunadasa (UPFA), 28,420 pv; Alawathuwala Jayadeva Chandrawansha (UNP), 28,134 pv; Upulangani Malagamuwa (UPFA), 26,801 pv; Dharmasiri Dasanayaka (UPFA), 25,839 pv; Abayarathna Herath Banda (UNP), 25,838 pv; Kuda Widanalage Shantha Bandara (UPFA), 25,334 pv; Ananda Chandralal (UPFA), 21,774 pv; A. A. Somasiri Gunathilaka (UPFA), 21,620 pv; Luxman Wendaruwa (UPFA), 21,595 pv; Alankarage Ruban Silva (UNP), 20,867 pv; Bandara Rajapaksha (UPFA), 20,530 pv; Prasanna Shamal Senarath (UNP), 20,345 pv; Dissanayaka Mudiyanselage Gamini Dissanayaka (UNP), 19,616 pv; R.M.Gunasinghe Banda (UNP), 19,537; Alavi Ahamad Hasan Mohomad (UNP), 18,821 pv; Ekanayaka Mudiyanselage Gamini Somasiri Ekanayaka (UNP), 16,404 pv; Ananda Punya Kumara (UNP), 16,018 pv; Ekanayaka Mudiyanselage Nanda Shanthi Kumari Ekanayaka (UNP), 15,383 pv; Mohmood Mohamed Thasleem (SLMC), 8,742 pv; and Aga Jawarsha M. Rizvi (SLMC), 6,017 pv.

2005 Presidential Election
Results of the 5th presidential election held on 17 November 2005 for the district:

2009 Provincial Council Election
Results of the 5th North Western provincial council election held on 14 February 2009 for the district:

The following candidates were elected:
Athula Wijesinghe (UPFA), 90,295 preference votes (pv); R. M. S. Somakumari Thennakoon (UPFA), 67,998 pv; K. W. Shantha Bandara (UPFA), 61,865 pv; Chandana Prasad Yapa (UPFA), 59,500 pv; Neranjan Wickramasinghe (UPFA), 56,768 pv; R. D. Wimaladasa (UPFA), 54,380 pv; Piyumal Herath (UPFA), 49,848 pv; Manjula Dissanayake (UPFA), 47,543 pv; D. B. Herath (UPFA), 43,896 pv; R. P. D. Gunadasa Dehigama (UPFA), 41,171 pv; Prasanna Shamal Senarath (UNP), 40,429 pv; H. M. D. B. Herath (UPFA), 38,371 pv; A. Don Kamal Indika (UPFA), 37,515 pv; A. A. Somasiri Gunathilaka (UPFA), 32,952 pv; Kumara Keerthi Chandrasiri (UPFA), 32,508 pv; R. M. Bandara Rajapaksha (UPFA), 32,252 pv; R. M. Nilantha Supun Rajapaksha (UPFA), 31,223 pv; Asanka Nawaratne (UPFA), 30,758 pv; Wendaruwa Lakshman (UPFA), 28,476 pv; Dharmasiri Dasanayaka (UPFA), 28,057 pv; Chandra Kamalasiri (UPFA), 28,033 pv; Adikari Mudiyanselage Tikiribandara Adikari (UPFA), 27,125 pv; Shelton Nimal Pieris (UPFA), 23,841 pv; Aga Jawarsha M. Rizvi (UNP), 22,663 pv; R. M. S. K. Rajapaksha (UPFA), 22,020 pv; Asuramana Pejjalage Keerthirathne (UPFA), 21,338 pv; Amarasena Girana Pathirannahalage Thushara Indunil (UNP), 20,581 pv; Alawathuwala J. C. (UNP), 19,131 pv; M. A. Nimal Senarath Wijesinghe (UNP), 17,400 pv; Alavi Ahamad Hasan Mohomad (UNP), 17,029 pv; Asanalebbege Mohommadu Nazeer Nazeer (UNP), 16,253 pv; Mohmood Mohamed Thasleem (UNP), 15,706 pv; Ajith Rohana Devatha Pejjalage (UNP), 15,468 pv; and K. M. Nimal Herath (JVP), 2,190 pv.

2010 Presidential Election
Results of the 6th presidential election held on 26 January 2010 for the district:

2010 Parliamentary General Election
Results of the 14th parliamentary election held on 8 April 2010 for the district:

The following candidates were elected:
Johnston Fernando (UPFA), 136,943 preference votes (pv); Dayasiri Jayasekara (UNF-UNP), 132,949 pv; T. B. Ekanayake (UPFA-SLFP), 112,420 pv; Anura Priyadharshana Yapa (UPFA-SLFP), 98,880 pv; K. W. Shantha Bandara (UPFA), 86,353 pv; S.B. Nawinne (UPFA-SLFP), 74,976 pv; Akila Viraj Kariyawasam (UNF-UNP), 66,477 pv; Jayarathna Herath (UPFA-SLFP), 64,645 pv; Salinda Dissanayake (UPFA-SLFP), 56,842 pv; Neranjan Wickramasinghe (UPFA), 54,572 pv; Indika Bandaranayake (UPFA), 48,665 pv; Tharanath Basnayake (UPFA), 46,079 pv; Gamini Jayawickrama Perera (UNF-UNP), 44,131 pv; Ashoka Abeysinghe (UNF), 32,990 pv; and Nimal Senarath Wijesinghe (UNF), 30,687 pv.

References

Electoral districts of Sri Lanka
Politics of Kurunegala District